Marian Aliuță (born 3 February 1978 in Bucharest) is a Romanian retired footballer who played as midfielder.

Career
Aliuță started to play football at Steaua București and as soon as he reached the age of 18 is loaned to Steaua Mizil and then to Chindia Târgovişte and Gloria Bistriţa. Released from him contract with Steaua București, Aliuță signed with FC Farul Constanţa in 1997 and then with Sheriff Tiraspol one year later.

1999 finds him in Ukraine, playing for Shakhtar Donetsk from where he returned to Romania in 2002 to finally make his debut for Steaua București, at that time being, with US$135,000 the highest paid footballer from Divizia A. Despite being voted as The Best Player of Divizia A at the end of 2002–03 season, Aliuță leaves Steaua București after an altercation with the club's Chief Executive Mihai Stoica. Rapid Bucharest is his next club, which he left after only few weeks to play in Korea for Chunnam Dragons and then in the 2005–06 season he played for FC Metalurg Donetsk. In November 2006 he signed a two-year contract with Iraklis Thessaloniki. After a 1-year spell in Greece, he returned to Romania where he signed for FC Timişoara, a club with a huge fan base. In the summer of 2008 he moved to UEFA Cup contenders FC Vaslui. But after only 11 games he had a dispute with the club's powerful owner, Adrian Porumboiu and was given a free transfer. In the beginning of 2009 signed for the Azerbaijan club Neftchi Baku, joining his long-time friend Adrian Neaga.

Honours

Club
Sheriff Tiraspol
 Moldovan Cup: 1998–99

Shakhtar Donetsk
 Ukrainian Premier League: 2001–02
 Ukrainian Cup: 2000–01, 2001–02

Vaslui
 UEFA Intertoto Cup: 2008

References

External links

1978 births
Living people
Footballers from Bucharest
Romanian footballers
FC Vaslui players
ACF Gloria Bistrița players
FC Rapid București players
FC Steaua București players
FCV Farul Constanța players
Romanian expatriate sportspeople in Moldova
FC Sheriff Tiraspol players
FC Shakhtar Donetsk players
FC Shakhtar-2 Donetsk players
FC Metalurh Donetsk players
Changchun Yatai F.C. players
Jeonnam Dragons players
Expatriate footballers in Moldova
Iraklis Thessaloniki F.C. players
FC Politehnica Timișoara players
K League 1 players
Chinese Super League players
Liga I players
Super League Greece players
Association football midfielders
Romania international footballers
Romanian expatriate footballers
Expatriate footballers in South Korea
Expatriate footballers in Ukraine
Expatriate footballers in China
Expatriate footballers in Greece
Expatriate footballers in Azerbaijan
Romanian expatriate sportspeople in South Korea
Romanian expatriate sportspeople in Ukraine
Romanian expatriate sportspeople in China
Romanian expatriate sportspeople in Greece
Romanian expatriate sportspeople in Azerbaijan
Ukrainian Premier League players
Ukrainian First League players
Neftçi PFK players